現代 or 现代 is an East Asian word which means modern times, modern, or present (time)

See Xiandai (disambiguation) (Xiàndài), for the Chinese/pinyin transliteration

現代 or 现代 may also refer to:

Companies
Hyundai (現代), a South Korean industrial conglomerate ("chaebol")
Hyundai Motor Company (現代自動車), a part of[Hyundai Kia Automotive Group
Hyundai Heavy Industries (現代重工業), a part of Hyundai Heavy Industries Group
Hyundai Asan (現代峨山), a division of Hyundai Group
Hyundai Engineering and Construction (現代建設), a division of Hyundai Development Group
Hyundai Unicorns (現代유니콘스), a professional baseball team owned by the Hyundai Group
Hyundai Department Store (現代百貨店), a department store chain in South Korea

Other uses
Close-up Gendai (クローズアップ現代), a TV show on NHK in Japan
Modern Education (現代教育), a cram school in Hong Kong
Gendai budō (現代武道), the modern Japanese martial arts
Shukan Gendai (週刊現代), a weekly magazine published by Kodansha in Japan
Gendai (現代), Nikkan Gendai (日刊現代), and Gekkan Gendai (月刊現代), sister magazines of the above published by Kodansha

See also 
Hyundai (disambiguation)